The 1996 Hamilton Tiger-Cats season was the 39th season for the team in the Canadian Football League and their 47th overall. The Tiger-Cats finished in 3rd place in the East Division with an 8–10 record. They appeared in the East Semi-Final but lost to the Montreal Alouettes.

Offseason

CFL Draft

Preseason

Regular season

Season standings

Schedule

Postseason

Awards and honours

1996 CFL All-Stars

References

Hamilton Tiger-Cats seasons
Hamilton